Die Harmonie der Welt (The Harmony of the World) is an opera in five acts by Paul Hindemith. The German libretto was by the composer.

The title of the opera is taken from Harmonices Mundi by the astronomer Johannes Kepler (1571–1630) who is the subject of the opera. Hindemith used the planetary system as a metaphor for his own musical arrangement of the chromatic scale.

The opera was completed in May 1957. Hindemith had previously composed a symphony of the same name in 1951.

Performance history
It was first performed on 11 August 1957, at the Prinzregententheater, Munich, conducted by the composer.

A truncated monaural recording of the opera appeared on the Stradivarius label, but a complete recording of the work had to wait until the digital era, when Marek Janowski conducted the entire opera for the Wergo label (see section Recordings).

Due to Kepler's association with his home town of Linz, Austria, performances of the opera were scheduled at the Landestheater Linz beginning on April 8, 2017, and continued for several performances into June, 2017. The Bruckner Orchestra Linz was conducted by Gerrit Prießnitz.

Roles

Synopsis
Set in the 17th century, the opera is the story of the search for universal harmony by the astronomer Johannes Kepler.

Recordings
In 2002 WERGO released the world premiere recording as part of their Paul Hindemith Edition.

References

Further reading
Skelton, Geoffrey (1992), 'Harmonie der Welt, Die' in The New Grove Dictionary of Opera, volume 2, page 647; ed. Stanley Sadie (London) .

External links

Operas by Paul Hindemith
German-language operas
1957 operas
Operas
Cultural depictions of Johannes Kepler
Operas based on real people
Operas set in the 17th century
Operas set in Germany